The 1974–75 Australian bushfire season is a series of bushfires, also known around the world as wildfires, that burned across Australia. Fires that summer burned up an estimated . Approximately 15% of Australia's land mass suffered "extensive fire damage" including parts of New South Wales, the Northern Territory, Queensland, South Australia and Western Australia.

Statistics

The Australian Bureau of Statistics attributed the extent of the fires to "exceptionally heavy rainfall in the previous two years".

Stephen J. Pyne qualified the fire season as the most destructive event in terms of hectares burned among historical fires in Australia, but added that “the 1974/75 fires had almost no impact and much of the damage was found by satellite after the fact.” Nonetheless, fire historian Danielle Clode notes that these fires remain significant for being the biggest bushfire event by area ever recorded. In 2011, retired Australian government scientist David Packham warned that "we are in for one big season" that could repeat the 1974 summer fires.

Areas impacted 
Australia, being a federation of States and territories, breaks up the 1974-1975 fires by state or region:

New South Wales
Six people killed. Area burned: . 50,000 livestock lost,  of fencing destroyed.  to Balranald, Cobar Shire, Moolah–Corinya—most of the Western Division.  Lost crops, and widespread damage to infrastructure, including communications, roads and railways.

The Moolah-Corinya fire was "the largest fire ever contained by man in New South Wales without the help of the weather."

Northern Territory
Area burned: .  The fire reached Barkly Tableland, Victoria River district, near Newcastle Waters.

Queensland
The bushfire season was defined as October 1974 to February 1975. Area burned: .  95 cattle, 6,850 sheep lost.  Areas damaged: Thargomindah, Bulloo Shire, Boulia Urandangie, McKinlay Shire.

South Australia
Area burned: . The areas affected were the north-west of the state (arid and semi-arid zones), and the Adelaide Hills.

Western Australia
Area burned:  of fires, damaging east and north-east of Kalgoorlie.

References

Bushfire seasons in Australia
1974 in Australia
1975 in Australia
1970s in New South Wales
1970s in Queensland
1970s in the Northern Territory
1970s in South Australia
1970s in Western Australia
1974 wildfires
1975 wildfires
Bush 
Bush
Bush
Bush